Making Enemies Is Good is an album by Backyard Babies, released in 2001. A number of tracks were co-written by Ginger of The Wildhearts. The album contains big hits such as "The Clash" and "Brand New Hate". The album was produced by the famous producer Thomas Skogsberg. Skogsberg also plays a keyboard solo in the song "Colours".

Track listing
All songs by Backyard Babies, except where noted.
"I Love to Roll" - 2:04
"Payback" - 3:03
"Brand New Hate" - 3:01 (Backyard Babies, Ginger)
"Colours" - 4:49
"Star War" - 3:06
"The Clash" - 3:06 (Backyard Babies, Thomander, Wikström)
"My Demonic Side" - 3:36
"The Kids Are Right" - 2:57
"Ex-Files" - 3:36
"Heaven 2.9" - 2:50
"Too Tough to Make Some Friends" - 2:17
"Painkiller" - 5:33 (Backyard Babies, Tyla)
"Bigger W/A Trigger" - 2:06

Personnel
Backyard Babies
Nicke Borg - lead vocals, guitar
Dregen - guitar, backing vocals, lead vocals on "Star War"
Johan Blomqvist - bass guitar
Peder Carlsson - drums

Charts

Weekly charts

Year-end charts

Certifications

References

2001 albums
Backyard Babies albums